The following are international rankings of :

Economics

 A.T. Kearney/Foreign Policy: Globalization Index, ranked 50 out of 62 countries.
 Heritage Foundation/The Wall Street Journal: Index of Economic Freedom, ranked 55 out of 157 countries.
 United Nations: Human Development Index, ranked 87 out of 177 countries
 World Economic Forum: Global Competitiveness Report Global Competitiveness Report 2011-2012, ranked 67 out of 142 countries.

Globalization

2010 KOF Index of Globalization ranked 61

Politics

 Reporters without borders: 2011-2012 Press Freedom Index, ranked 115 out of 179 countries
 Transparency International: 2011 Corruption Perceptions Index, ranked 80 out of 182 countries

References

Peru